Samuel Finley Patterson (March 11, 1799 – January 20, 1874) was a North Carolina politician, planter, and businessman.

Biography
Born in Rockbridge County, Virginia, Patterson went to live with his uncle in Wilkesboro, North Carolina, in 1811. He married Phoebe Caroline Jones, a granddaughter of William Lenoir, in 1824. The two would live much of their life together at her family home, "Palmyra", in Caldwell County, a county which he helped persuade the state legislature to create in 1841. He and his wife had several children, including politicians Rufus Lenoir (1830–1879) and Samuel Legerwood Patterson (1850–1918), who served as North Carolina Commissioner of Agriculture.

Patterson had a lifelong interest in politics. At the age of 22, he won the position of engrossing clerk of the North Carolina House of Commons. He later became clerk of the North Carolina Senate, and, from 1835 to 1837, he served as state treasurer. Even though Patterson was a Whig, he was elected treasurer by a majority-Democratic state legislature. While serving as treasurer, he also served as president of the state bank.

Patterson served as chair of the Caldwell County court; as a member of the House of Commons (1854); and as a state senator (1846, 1848, and 1864). In 1866, he served as a delegate to the second session of the state's constitutional convention. Other offices Patterson held included president of the Raleigh and Gaston Railroad, clerk of the Superior Court, justice of the peace, Indian commissioner, trustee of the University of North Carolina, and various positions with the Masons.

He died at Palmyra on January 20, 1874.

References

Origin of Patterson School
Inventory of the Jones and Patterson Family Papers
North Carolina Manual of 1913

1799 births
1874 deaths
People from Rockbridge County, Virginia
People from Caldwell County, North Carolina
Members of the North Carolina House of Representatives
North Carolina state senators
State treasurers of North Carolina
American planters
19th-century American politicians
American justices of the peace
19th-century American judges